USCGC Tahoe was a  of the United States Coast Guard launched on 12 June 1928  and commissioned on 8 November 1928. After 13 years of service with the Coast Guard, she was transferred to the Royal Navy as part of the Lend-Lease Act.

Career

US Coast Guard - Tahoe 
After commissioning in November 1928 with Commander Leon C. Covell in command, the Tahoe was homeported in San Francisco and assigned to the Bering Sea Patrol.

Royal Navy - Fishguard 
As part of the Lend-Lease Act she was transferred to the Royal Navy where she was renamed HMS Fishguard (Y59) and commissioned on 12 May 1941. In May 1944, the crew of Fishguard boarded U-852 and captured her crew after she was damaged by British aircraft. At the end of the war, in March 1946, Fishguard was returned to the USCG.

US Coast Guard - Tahoe (post war) 
Upon her return to the USCG, her recommissioning was cancelled and she was sold in October 1947.

See also
 List of United States Coast Guard cutters

References

Lake-class cutters
Banff-class sloops
Ships of the United States Coast Guard
World War II sloops of the United Kingdom